Clifford Ivor Edwards (8 March 1921 – March 1989) was an English professional footballer who played as a wing half for West Bromwich Albion and Bristol City.

Notes

References

1921 births
1989 deaths
English footballers
Footballers from Staffordshire
Association football midfielders
Cannock Town F.C. players
West Bromwich Albion F.C. players
Bristol City F.C. players
Ebbsfleet United F.C. players